Life, Love and Faith is the fourth album by R&B artist Allen Toussaint. It was released in 1972 and has received positive reviews. Warner Reprise ranks Life, Love and Faith as a very influential singer/songwriter album.  The album also shows signs of early funk. Twenty-two musicians helped Toussaint record the album including one of his family members, Vincent Toussaint, and George Porter Jr. and Leo Nocentelli from The Meters, a group associated with Toussaint.
The album is considered one of Toussaint's best.

Track listing
All tracks composed by Allen Toussaint
"Victims of the Darkness
"Am I Expecting Too Much"
"My Baby is the Real Thing"
"Goin' Down"
"She Once Belonged to Me"
"Out of the City (Into Country Life)"
"Soul Sister"
"Fingers and Toes"
"I've Got to Convince Myself"
"On Your Way Down"
"Gone Too Far"
"Electricity"

Personnel
Allen Toussaint - vocals, piano, acoustic guitar, harmonica, arrangements
George Plummer, Leo Nocentelli, Vincent Toussaint - guitar
George Porter Jr. - bass
Walter Payton - acoustic bass
Joe Lambert, Joseph Modeliste - drums
Alfred Roberts, Squirrel - congas
Alvin Thomas, Gary Brown - saxophone
Francis Rousselle - trumpet
Clyde Kerr, Jr. - trumpet, trombone
Lee Hildebrand - liner notes

References 

1972 albums
Allen Toussaint albums
Warner Records albums